Yallahs is a city located on the southeastern coast of Jamaica in the parish of St Thomas and is home to Jordan 1don  ( who is also recognized as the wealthiest person in the parish ) Yallahs has   an estimated 10,000 inhabitants. The city was recorded as "Yealoth" in the 1662 census. It may have received its name from Captain Yallahs, a 1671 privateer, or the privateer may have received his pseudonym from the city. Yallahs' name could have simply come from the Spanish word 'yalos', meaning frost, because the high white cliffs in that area have been thought to give an appearance of frost. The city is infamously known for it high crime rate in places like, poor mans corner, Newland, fish bowl Lane, habby carby lane and phase 1 

Yallahs was chosen as the site of the first Baptist church in Jamaica in 1822. The Rev. Joshua Tinson’s attempt to start the Baptist church was thwarted, but he returned in 1828 and succeeded in establishing both a church and school. The Yallahs River is a source of fresh water for the inhabitants of the neighbouring City Of Kingston and St. Andrew and provides residents with water through the Yallahs Pipeline. It is home to a plethora of Christian denominations and is a contributor to the mining industry through gravel extraction that happens along the Yallahs River bank. The city is governed by the St. Thomas Parish Council which is located in the parish's capital town, Morant Bay.

Geography

The town of Yallahs is located in the southwestern section of the parish of St. Thomas in Jamaica. It is made up of a collaboration of districts, communities and villages surrounding the Yallahs River Basin including:

West Of The River

 Sun Valley
 Albion Estate
 East Albion (North Of Albion Estate)

East Of The River

 Poor Man's Corner
 Yallahs Housing Scheme 1
 Yallahs Housing Scheme 2
 Yallahs Housing Scheme 3
 Heartese
 Norris
 Hampstead
 Logwood
 Montpellier
 Newland District
 Lloyd's Pen
 Southaven
 Knightsville
 Baptist
 Pondside (North Of The Yallahs Pond)
 Lowden Hill (North Of The Yallahs Pond)

History
The town was one of the main towns in which the Taínos once lived. The Spanish explorers renamed the town when they arrived in the island.

Economy

Transportation

Sport

References

External links
 Aerial view.
 Yallahs at Official Jamaica Tourist Board

Populated coastal places in Jamaica
Populated places established in 1671
Populated places in Saint Thomas Parish, Jamaica
1671 establishments in the British Empire